Chonemorpha is a genus that consists of large evergreen vigorous woody vines with milky sap from India, Sri Lanka, to Southeast Asia, the Philippines and South China. Growing dormant in sub-tropical and tropical climates and usually losing leaves if temperature gets below 60F. The plants have pubescent to almost tomentose branches, leaves and inflorescences. Large, corrugated, ovate leaves to 40 cm long, deep glossy green, opposite, pale and hairy beneath. Very fragrant, funnel-shaped, showy flowers to 8 cm across with long-peduncled and terminal cymes. Corolla cream with yellow center. Disk cupular with many seeds, ovate-shaped, compressed, with scanty endosperm, with a tuft of hairs at one end, dark brown. The plant is widely grown as a fence cover.

Species
 Chonemorpha assamensis Furtado - Assam, Bangladesh
 Chonemorpha eriostylis Pit. in H.Lecomte - Yunnan, Guangdong, Vietnam
 Chonemorpha floccosa Tsiang & P.T.Li - Guangxi
 Chonemorpha fragrans  (Moon) Alston (Frangipani Vine ) - China (Guangxi, Yunnan, Tibet), Indian Subcontinent, Indochina (its name in Khmer is /vɔə crẹj cruəj/ វល្លិជ្រៃជ្រួយ or /vɔə ʔɑŋkɑt krəhɑːm/ វល្លិអង្កត់ក្រហម), Malaysia, Indonesia, Philippines
 Chonemorpha megacalyx Pierre ex Spire - Yunnan, Laos, Thailand
 Chonemorpha mollis Miq. - Java
 Chonemorpha parviflora Tsiang & P.T.Li - Yunnan, Guangxi
 Chonemorpha pedicellata Rao - W Himalayas
 Chonemorpha splendens Chun & Tsiang - Yunnan, Hainan
 Chonemorpha verrucosa  (Blume) D.J.Middleton - Guangdong, Hainan, Yunnan, Bhutan, Assam, Bangladesh, Indonesia, Malaysia, Indochina

formerly included
Chonemorpha antidysenterica G.Don = Holarrhena pubescens Wall. ex G.Don

References

Botanica Sistematica

Apocynaceae genera
Apocyneae